Muxiyuan station is a station on Line 8 of the Beijing Subway. It was opened on December 30, 2018.

Station Layout 
The station has an underground island platform.

Exits 
There are 4 exits, lettered A2, B1, B2, and C. Exits A2, B1, and B2 are accessible.

References 
 Beijing Subway official map, showing official English name

Beijing Subway stations in Dongcheng District